Théotime Blanchard (May 8, 1844 – March 11, 1911) was a teacher, farmer, merchant and politician in the Province of New Brunswick, Canada. He represented Gloucester County from 1870 to 1875 and from 1892 to 1894 in the Legislative Assembly of New Brunswick and Gloucester in the House of Commons of Canada from 1894 to 1900 as a Conservative member.

He was born in Caraquet, New Brunswick, the son of Agapit Blanchard and Anne-Marie Poirier, and the grandson of Tranquille Blanchard. He taught school in Neguac and in Caraquet. In 1867, he married Marie Gauvin. Blanchard was later named a justice of the peace.

A Roman Catholic, in the New Brunswick Legislative Assembly he helped lead the opposition to the Common Schools Act of 1871 that banned religious instruction in the province's school system based on the principle of Separation of church and state. Blanchard resigned his seat in the assembly and was appointed inspector of weights and measures for Restigouche County in 1876. From 1887 to 1892, he served as customs inspector at Caraquet. Blanchard was the first Acadian elected to the provincial assembly and the Canadian House of Commons from Gloucester County. He was defeated by Onésiphore Turgeon when he ran for reelection in 1900 and again in 1904. He died in Bathurst at the age of 66 after being injured in a vehicle accident.

Electoral record

References
 
 

1844 births
1911 deaths
Road incident deaths in Canada
Businesspeople from New Brunswick
Canadian schoolteachers
Canadian farmers
Acadian people
Members of the House of Commons of Canada from New Brunswick
Conservative Party of Canada (1867–1942) MPs
Progressive Conservative Party of New Brunswick MLAs
Accidental deaths in New Brunswick
People from Caraquet
Canadian justices of the peace